1881 was the 95th season of cricket in England since the foundation of Marylebone Cricket Club (MCC). There was a first outright title win by Lancashire and a strike by the Nottinghamshire professionals, led by their main bowler Alfred Shaw, over benefits and terms.

Champion County

 Lancashire

Playing record (by county)

Leading batsmen (qualification 20 innings)

Leading bowlers (qualification 1,000 balls)

Nottinghamshire strike
Nottinghamshire's professionals, led by Alfred Shaw, held a strike over playing contracts agreed by the MCC and secretary Captain Henry Holden. The players demanded security of contract for all games during the season and the right to organise their own terms rather than those set by the MCC, which during the 1870s as county cricket grew established a strong grip on terms for professional players.

The dispute meant that seven of Nottinghamshire's top players did not play for the first half of the season, and leading batsman Arthur Shrewsbury played only three first-class games all year. Shaw and Shrewsbury used the dispute to organise an eight-month tour of Australia and New Zealand during the winter.

Notable events
 The scheduled 18 to 20 July county match between Lancashire and Middlesex was cancelled because Harrow Wanderers booked Lord's ground and no alternative arrangement could be made to play the game.
 Frederick Randon Sr was struck by a delivery that resulted in his death two years later in 1883.

See also
Derbyshire County Cricket Club in 1881

Notes
An unofficial seasonal title sometimes proclaimed by consensus of media and historians prior to December 1889 when the official County Championship was constituted. Although there are ante-dated claims prior to 1873, when residence qualifications were introduced, it is only since that ruling that any quasi-official status can be ascribed.
The match between Middlesex and Lancashire at Lord's was cancelled because Harrow Wanderers had booked the ground on the same day.

References

Annual reviews
 John Lillywhite’s Cricketer’s Companion (Green Lilly), Lillywhite, 1882
 James Lillywhite’s Cricketers’ Annual (Red Lilly), Lillywhite, 1882
 John Wisden's Cricketers' Almanack 1882

External links
 CricketArchive – season summaries

1881 in English cricket
English cricket seasons in the 19th century